= Varun Vagish =

Indian travel vlogger

- Born: March 29, 1982 (age 43) delhi, India
- Education: University of Delhi
- Occupations: YouTuber; Influencer
- Years active: 2017–present

YouTube information
- Channel: Mountain Trekker
- Subscribers: 1.57 million
- Views: 241 million
- Last updated: 22 October 2025

Varun Vagish also known as Mountain Trekker, is an Indian travel vlogger, content creator, and influencer. He is recognized for his YouTube channel "Mountain Trekker," where he presents travel vlogs, budget travel suggestions, and adventure activities.

== Early life and education ==
He was born in Delhi, India. During his childhood and teenage years, he moved across various states, including Maharashtra, Uttar Pradesh, Rajasthan, and Andhra Pradesh, due to his studies. This extensive travel during his formative years nurtured a deep passion for exploration. He later returned to Delhi for higher education, where he pursued and earned a PhD in Mass Communication. During this time, his fascination with mountains drove him to frequently visit the Himalayas, especially the remote villages of Himachal Pradesh and Uttarakhand. These travels enriched him with unique experiences and a deep appreciation for local cultures.

== Career ==
He began his journey as a travel vlogger under the name "Mountain Trekker." He created his YouTube channel, Mountain Trekker, in 2017, focusing on travel vlogs that highlight his journeys across various destinations, especially those that are less explored and off the beaten path.
